Nebriinae is a subfamily of ground beetles in the family Carabidae. There are about 12 genera and more than 840 described species in Nebriinae.

Genera
These 12 genera belong to the subfamily Nebriinae:

 Archaeocindis Kavanaugh & Erwin, 1991
 Cicindis Bruch, 1908
 Leistus Frölich, 1799
 Nebria Latreille, 1802
 Nippononebria Ueno, 1955
 Notiokasis Kavanaugh & Nègre, 1983
 Notiophilus Duméril, 1805
 Opisthius Kirby, 1837
 Paropisthius Casey, 1920
 Pelophila Dejean, 1821
 † Archaeonebria Kavanaugh & J.Schmidt, 2019
 † Ledouxnebria Deuve, 1998

References

 
Carabidae subfamilies